Léo Jaime da Silva Pinheiro (born March 23, 1986 in Fortaleza), known as Léo Jaime, is a Brazilian footballer who plays for São Bernardo as forward.

Career statistics

References

External links

1986 births
Living people
Brazilian footballers
Brazilian expatriate footballers
Association football forwards
Campeonato Brasileiro Série B players
Campeonato Brasileiro Série C players
K League 2 players
Ferroviário Atlético Clube (CE) players
Fortaleza Esporte Clube players
Clube Atlético Bragantino players
Daegu FC players
Associação Desportiva São Caetano players
Sociedade Esportiva e Recreativa Caxias do Sul players
Horizonte Futebol Clube players
Associação Ferroviária de Esportes players
São Bernardo Futebol Clube players
Brazilian expatriate sportspeople in South Korea
Expatriate footballers in South Korea
Sportspeople from Fortaleza